The 2022 World Singles Ninepin Bowling Classic Championships was the eighth edition of the world singles championships and held in Elva, Estonia, from 23 May to 28 May 2022.

Initially planned to take place in Tartu. However, the organizers, due to the preparation of new sports facilities, decided to replace Championships to Elva.

Participants 

Below is the list of countries who participated in the championships.

Schedule 
Seven events  will be held.

All times are local (UTC+3).

Medal summary

Medal table

Men

Women

Mixed

References 

 
World Singles Ninepin Bowling Classic Championships
2022 in bowling
bowling
bowling
bowling